

Bungaroosh (also spelt bungeroosh, bungarouche, bungarooge, bunglarooge, bunglarouge and other variations) is a composite building material used almost exclusively in the English seaside resort of Brighton and its attached neighbour Hove between the mid-18th and late 19th centuries, when it grew from a fishing village into a large town.  Bungaroosh is often found in buildings of that era in the town and in its near neighbours Worthing and Lewes, but is little known elsewhere.  In this respect, it is similar to mathematical tiles - another localised building material introduced in, and characteristic of, that era.  It can incorporate any of a wide variety of substances and materials, and is used most often in external walls.

The manufacture of bungaroosh involved placing miscellaneous materials, such as whole or broken bricks, cobblestones, flints (commonly found on the South Downs around Brighton), small pebbles, sand and pieces of wood into hydraulic lime and then pouring it between shuttering until it has set.  The shuttering (formwork) process typically involved erecting a wooden frame (often made out of railway sleepers after they became readily available in the 19th century), pouring in the lime and adding solid materials to the mixture.  Other structural fittings, such as brick piers or wooden lintels, could then be added if more support was needed or other structures were to be added.  This was particularly common in Brighton, where bungaroosh walls were often built behind the impressive stuccoed façades of Regency-style houses. The material is particularly prevalent in the early 19th-century squares, crescents and terraces of Brighton's seafront, such as Regency Square, Royal Crescent and the Kemp Town estate.  Another technique was to wait for the mixture to set, then render it with a lime-based mixture and paint it.  This produced a consistent, regular surface which could be used to build the symmetrical façades required in Georgian architecture - a popular style in Lewes.

Although the material is solid once set, it has poor resistance to water.  If it dries out completely, it can crumble away; but if it gets wet it can dissolve and start to move, causing structural failure.  Regular drying-out and saturation caused by the effects of the weather has caused some bay-window fronts to collapse in Brighton.  A common maxim states that much of Brighton "could be demolished with a well-aimed hose"; the supposed extent of this destruction varies between "a third" and "half" depending on the source.

The etymology of the word is unknown, but the first part may derive from the colloquial verb "to bung", meaning to put something somewhere hastily or carelessly.

See also
Buildings and architecture of Brighton and Hove
Core-and-veneer

References

Notes

Bibliography

Other resources
  (from The Regency Society)

Composite materials
Building materials
Types of wall
Brighton